Paul John Ellis (25 May 1941 – 20 February 2005) was a professor of physics at University of Minnesota for over 30 years. He is noted for his earlier work examining effective interactions inside nuclei, coupled channel approaches to nuclear reactions, and later work looking at dense nuclear matter inside neutron stars and developing a set of effective lagrangians that take into account scale and chiral symmetry.

Selected publications

 Ellis, P. J. (1990). Trends in theoretical physics: Based on the 1988-89 Distinguished-Speaker Colloquium Series of the Theoretical Physics Institute at the University of Minnesota. Redwood City, Calif: Addison-Wesley.

References

1941 births
2005 deaths
American nuclear physicists
American astrophysicists
University of Minnesota faculty
British emigrants to the United States
Fellows of the American Physical Society